Landi may refer to:

People
 Landi family
 Doria-Pamphili-Landi, a noble family from Genoa, Italy

Surname
 Neroccio di Bartolomeo de' Landi (1447-1500), Italian artist
 Maria Landi (15??–1599), consort of Ercole Grimaldi, Lord of Monaco
 Maria Teresa Landi, Italian epidemiologist and oncologist 
 Lorenzo Landi (1567-1627), Bishop of Fossombrone 
 Benedetto Landi (1578-1638), Bishop of Fossombrone
 Marco Landi (died 1593), Bishop of Ascoli Satriano
 Stefano Landi (1587-1639), Italian Baroque composer
 Lelio Landi (died 1610), Bishop of Nardò
 Francesco Landi (1682-1757), cardinal
 Giuseppe Antonio Landi (1713-1791), Italian architect and painter
 Antonio Landi (1725-1783), Italian poet, writer and playwright
 Gaspare Landi (1756–1830), Italian artist
 Aristodemo Landi (active after 1880), Italian painter
 Lamberto Landi (1882-1950), Italian composer and conductor
 Bruno Landi (tenor) (1900-1968), tenor
 Bruno Landi (cyclist) (born 1928), Italian racing cyclist
 Elissa Landi (1904-1948), Italian actress
 Chico Landi (1907-1989), Brazilian race-car driver
 Marcello Landi (1916-1993), Italian painter and poet
 Mario Landi (1920-1992), Italian actor
 Aldo Bufi Landi (1923-), Italian actor
 Lilia Landi (born 1929), Italian film actress
 Gino Landi (1933–2023), Italian choreographer and director
 Roberto Landi (1956-), Italian footballer
 Frédéric Luca Landi (1973-), French fashion designer, photographer and editor
 Laurent Landi (born 1977), French-American artistic gymnastics coach 
 Cecile Canqueteau-Landi (born 1979), French artistic gymnast and coach
 Alex Landi, American actor
 Andrea Justine Landi (born 1988), American volleyball player
 Evan Landi (born 1990), American football tight end 
 Paolo Emilio Landi, Italian theatrical director, journalist, and documentarian
 Ali Landi, (2006-2021), Iranian hero

Given name
 Landi Swanepoel, South African model

Places

Iran 
 Landi, Iran, a village

Pakistan
 Havid Landi Dak, a town in Bannu District, Khyber Pakhtunkhwa
 Landi Kotal, the highest point on the Khyber Pass
 Landi Arbab, a village in Peshawar District, Khyber Pakhtunkhwa

Italy
 Caselle Landi, a municipality (comune) in the province of Lodi, Lombardia
 Landi State, a valley of the Taro river, a tributary of the Po

Other uses 
 Landi, an agricultural cooperatives in Switzerland, part of Fenaco
 Landi Renzo, an Italian company
 2381 Landi, an asteroid
 Calophyllum brasiliense, a tropical tree colloquially known as Landi
 Landi (typeface), a foundry type made by Ludwig & Mayer

See also
 Lando (disambiguation)
 Pope Lando: Lando or Landus (in Latin), the last pope to use his own surname
 Lahndi (disambiguation)
 Landy (disambiguation)